Chaval is a privately owned company that designs and manufactures heated clothing. The company makes heated gloves for Alpine skiing, Freeskiing, and any winter sport activity.

The company's heated gloves and technology has been reviewed by various media sources including Men's Journal, Financial Times and Gear Junkie.  Polymer Solutions named the heating technology as one of "Top 25 Innovations Made With Polymers" in 2013.

The company's headquarters is in Bainbridge Island, WA.

See also
Wearable technology
Raynaud's phenomenon

References

External links
Chaval Outdoor Official Site
Gloves Advice, Tips & Reviews
Safety Gloves, Aprons & Gowns

Gloves
Outdoor clothing brands